The 2014 Magyar Kupa, known as ( for sponsorship reasons), is the 88th edition of the tournament.

Quarter-finals

Quarter-final matches were played on 8 and 9 November 2014.

|}

Final four

The final four will be held on 5 and 7 December 2014 at the Városi Sportuszoda in Szentes.

Semi-finals

Final

Final standings

See also
 2014–15 Országos Bajnokság I

References

External links
 Hungarian Water Polo Federaration 

Seasons in Hungarian water polo competitions
Hungary
Magyar Kupa